Eleftheria Mavrogeni (born 12 May 1970) is a Greek handball player who competed in the 2004 Summer Olympics.

References

1970 births
Living people
Greek female handball players
Olympic handball players of Greece
Handball players at the 2004 Summer Olympics
Sportspeople from Veria